This is a list of number one singles for the year 1967 on the New Zealand Singles Chart.

Chart

References

1967
1967 in New Zealand
1967 record charts
1960s in New Zealand music